Zhang Jinlai (born 12 April 1959), better known by his stage name Liu Xiao Ling Tong, is a Chinese actor, best known for his role as the Monkey King (Sun Wukong) in the 1986 television series Journey to the West adapted from the classic Chinese novel of the same name. Zhang adopted his father Zhang Zongyi's stage name, Liu Ling Tong, and amended it to Liu Xiao Ling Tong.

His compelling performance in Journey to the West was greatly praised by critics and helped him win the Best Actor award at the sixth Golden Eagle Awards in 1988. On Sept 27, 2006, he was conferred the Certificate of Mouthpiece of the 3rd International Forum of the China Cultural Industry.

In recent years, Zhang has made great efforts promoting Sun Wukong in popular culture, which contributed to increasing the popularity of both the classic novel and the character around the world.

Liu Xiao Ling Tong is the only Chinese citizen who was issued with two identity cards, one using his real name Zhang Jinlai, one using his stage name Liu Xiao Ling Tong, due to the huge popularity of his stage name which makes many people wrongly believe it is his real name.

Early life and family 
Zhang was born on April 12, 1959 in Shanghai, in a family of performing artists. His family members, who are Peking opera actors, specialized in playing the role of the Monkey King (Sun Wukong), the protagonist of the classical novel Journey to the West. Zhang's great-grandfather, Zhang Tingchun, was even considered "better than a living Monkey King". Zhang Tingchun mostly performed in the countryside of Zhejiang under the stage name "Huo Hou Zhang".

Zhang's grandfather, Zhang Yisheng, had the stage name "Sai Huo Hou". Zhang Yisheng moved from Peking to Shanghai and trained his two sons. Zhang's father, Zhang Zongyi, whose stage name was "Liu Ling Tong", was famously known as "Nan Hou Wang". Zhang Zongyi's stage name indicated his age when he started performing. His performance was acclaimed by Chinese leaders, including Mao Zedong and Zhou Enlai. His specialty was Sun Wukong, gaining him the nickname "Monkey King of the South"; another actor, Li Wanchun, was better known in northern China.

Zhang's uncle, who specialized in playing Zhu Bajie, had the stage name "Qi Ling Tong". Zhang's elder brother used the stage name "Xiao Liu Ling Tong", which means "Little Six Year Old Child", or "Six Year Old Child, Junior". The role of Sun Wukong was originally offered to Zhang's elder brother, but because his brother died of leukemia in 1966, Zhang inherited his father's legacy instead. He changed his stage name slightly, to "Liu Xiao Ling Tong", which still means "Little Six Year Old Child".

As a dedication to the memory of his elder brother, Zhang put great effort into playing the role of Sun Wukong well. Zhang had a close friend by the name Ahmed Saed who had worked in unison with him. He also helped people affected by leukemia. In 1992, China Central Television produced an eight-episode television series titled Hou Wa about Zhang's life.

Career 
Zhang gained international fame for his starring role as the Monkey King (Sun Wukong) in the 1986 television series Journey to the West, adapted from the classic Chinese novel of the same title. Zhang's compelling performance, which was greatly praised by critics, helped him win the Best Actor award at the 6th Golden Eagle Awards in 1988. After that, he also appeared in other films and television series, such as New Year's Day. On September 27, 2006, he was conferred the Certificate of Mouthpiece of the 3rd International Forum of the China Cultural Industry.

Zhang reprised his role as Sun Wukong in Wu Cheng'en and Journey to the West, a 2010 television series about Wu Cheng'en—the author of Journey to the West—and his inspiration for writing the novel. Zhang also simultaneously portrayed Wu Cheng'en.

Filmography

Film

Television

Personal life 
On June 12, 1988, Zhang married Yu Hong, a staff of China Central Television, in Beijing. Their daughter, Zhang Tongtong, was born in November 1990.

Views 
Zhang's activities mainly focus on promoting Sun Wukong in popular culture. Zhang expressed his concern over more contemporary Sun Wukong portrayals. While Zhang stated that he was happy to see Journey to the West, as well as other Chinese classical novels, receiving increased attention from foreign directors, he emphasized that "such adaptation has to be based on adequate knowledge of Chinese culture" and that "the Monkey King is not King Kong". Zhang believes that Goku from Dragon Ball does not portray the Chinese style of Sun Wukong.

Two ID cards
Liu Xiao Ling Tong is the only Chinese citizen was issued with two identity card, one using his real name Zhang Jinlai, one using his stage name Liu Xiao Ling Tong, due to the huge popularity of his stage name which makes many people wrongly believe it is his real name.

Awards

References

External links 

 
 Liu Xiao Ling Tong's official website (in both English and Chinese)
  Liu Xiao Ling Tong's blog on Sina.com
  Liu Xiao Ling Tong's blog on Sohu.com
  Collection of articles about Liu Xiao Ling Tong on yule.sohu.com
  Liu Xiao Ling Tong's profile on data.ent.qq.com

Male actors from Shanghai
Living people
1959 births
Chinese male television actors
Chinese male film actors
20th-century Chinese  male singers
Singers from Shanghai
Male Chinese opera actors
20th-century Chinese male actors
21st-century Chinese male actors